International Public Partnerships is a large British publicly listed investment company dedicated to infrastructure investments. Established in 2006 as Babcock & Brown Public Partnerships, the company adopted its present name on 25 June 2009. It is a constituent of the FTSE 250 Index. The chairman is Michael Gerrard.

References

External links
  Official site

Financial services companies established in 2006
Financial services companies of the United Kingdom
Companies listed on the London Stock Exchange